The London, Brighton and South Coast Railway E5 class was a class of 0-6-2T side tank steam locomotive designed by  Robert Billinton.  They were introduced in 1902 and were a larger version of the E4 Class intended for semi-fast secondary passenger work.

History

As the weight of passenger trains continued to grow steadily during the 1890s and 1900s  Robert Billinton decided to enlarge his radial tank classes still further by introducing a  wheeled version incorporating the C2 class boiler. Thirty E5 locomotives were built by Brighton Works between November 1902 and November 1904. In addition to more power and a higher top speed, they also had more fuel capacity than the E4 class. 

The E5s were deemed to be fairly successful and locomotives achieved high mileages, but in 1911 four examples were rebuilt by D. E. Marsh with the larger C3 class  boiler and were re-classified E5X. This experiment was not however a success and the performance was not greatly improved and higher centre of gravity made for rougher running at speed. 

All of the class survived the transfer to Southern Railway ownership in 1923. One E5 was however withdrawn in 1936 and another in 1944 following a collision. The remainder continued in regular use following the nationalisation of the Southern Railway to become a part of British Railways in 1948. However, many of the class were now worn out and the arrival of a large number of new 2-6-4T locomotives in Southern England enabled the withdrawal of the remaining members of the class between 1949 and 1956. No examples have been preserved.

Numbering

British Railways (BR) numbers were 32399-32406, 32567-32576 and 32583-32594. The E5X locomotives were 32401, 32570, 32576, and 32586.

Sources

 Bradley, D.L. (1974) Locomotives of the London Brighton and South Coast Railway, Part 3. Railway Correspondence and Travel Society.

External links 
 E5 Class (SEMG gallery)
 Class E-5 Details at Rail UK
 Class E5X Details at Rail UK

0-6-2T locomotives
E5
Railway locomotives introduced in 1902
Standard gauge steam locomotives of Great Britain
Scrapped locomotives